Jules-Édouard Alboize de Pujol (1805, Montpellier – 9 April 1854, Paris) was a French historian and playwright. Director of the Théâtre de l'Atelier in Montmartre, Alboize Pujol wrote several dramas and comedies, either alone or in collaboration.

Selected works

Publications
Christiern de Danemark, ou les masques noirs, with Paul Foucher, Paris, Marchant, 1836.
La Guerre des servantes, a drama in five acts and seven tableaux, with Charles Emmanuel Theaulon and Jean Harel, 26 August  1837.
L’Idiote, a drama in three acts and in prose, performed in the Théâtre de la Porte-Saint-Antoine, 2 December 1837, Paris, JN Barba, 1837.
Le Tribut des cent vierges, Bernard Lopez, E. Duverger, performed at the Théâtre de la Gaîté, Paris, Sn, 1841.
Marie Simon, a drama in five acts, with Saint-Yves, Paris, 1852.
Les Chevaux du carrousel, ou le Dernier jour de Venise, a drama in five acts, with Paul Foucher, Paris, Dondey Widow Dupre [S. d.].

Librettos
Tabarin, with Georges Bousquet and Andrel, Paris, Grus, v. In 1852.

History
Histoire de la Bastille depuis sa fondation (1374) jusqu’à sa destruction (1789), with Arnold Auguste and Auguste Maquet, Paris, Library Administration, 1840.
Description pittoresque de la succursale de l’hôtel royal des invalides à Avignon, with Arnoult and Maquet, Avignon, Bonnet sons, 1845.
Les Prisons de l’Europe, with Auguste Maquet, Paris, Library Administration, 1845.
Fastes des Gardes nationales de France, Paris, Goubaud and Olivier, 1849.

References

Attribution
This article is based on the translation of the corresponding article of the French Wikipedia. A list of contributors can be found there at the History secttion.

External links
 

1805 births
1854 deaths
Writers from Montpellier
19th-century French dramatists and playwrights
French opera librettists
Writers from Occitania (administrative region)
19th-century French male writers